Haji Buland Khan was an Indian politician and bureaucrat. He was part of the 6th, 7th and 8th Jammu and Kashmir Legislative assembly (Vidhan Sabha).

He represented the Gulabgarh constituency of Reasi district of the erstwhile State of Jammu and Kashmir for 3 times. He was also elected as a member of Jammu and Kashmir Legislative Council in 1996. Khan Sahib also worked as an Auditor in Jammu & Kashmir Co-operative Department from 1955-1960. Khan sahib was also the vice chairman Gujjar and bakerwal advisory board ( with mos status ) for two times . i.e. From 1986 - 1990 and from 1997 - 2007 . He was also the founder chairman of Gujjar and bakerwal conference , an organisation dedicated for the upliftment of Gujjar and bakerwal community

For almost 9 years he served as Chairman of Panchayat Halqa Thuroo. He served for 14 years as Vice Chairman of Gujar Bakarwal board. In 1962 Khan was requested by Sheikh Abdullah to join Plebiscite Front. Haji Sahib was also jailed in special jail Jammu for six months after joining Plebiscite Front. Khan Sahib was given many life threats but he did not pay attention to that.

Khan Sahib in 1996 did not contest election so ticket was given to his son Ajaz Ahmed Khan. Khan Sahib was elected as Member of Jammu & Kashmir Legislative Council in October 1996 by National Conference. He also represented  the problems of his community to Manmohan Singh Ji who was Prime Minister of India at that time and to Sonia Gandhi UPA chairperson back then & Home Minister Shivraj Patil. He died on 6.06.2007 at his official residence at Srinagar after a prolonged illness.

After his death state mourned for 3 days by flag down & 3 day state holiday. His eldest son Ajaz Ahmed Khan represents Gool-Arnas Vidhan sabha Constituency 10th, 11th & 12th Jammu & Kashmir Legislative Assembly & also served as Minister of State. ajaz Ahmed khan sahab is also following the footsteps of haji sahab and doing appreciatable work for the people of ST community as well as for the people of jammu kashmir . Khan Sahib younger son represents Gulabgarh Vidhan sabha Constituency in 12th Jammu & Kashmir Legislative Assembly. Khan Sahib daughter is married to Chowdhary Zulfkar Ali Cabinet Minister in Mehbooba Mufti & Mufti Mohammad Sayeed Govt.

References 

1931 births
2007 deaths
Indian civil servants
Jammu & Kashmir National Conference politicians
Reasi district